Undibacterium piscinae is a Gram-negative, rod-shaped, non-spore-forming, obligate aerobic and motile bacterium of the genus Undibacterium which has been isolated from the intestinal tract of the fish Coreoleuciscus splendidus.

References

Burkholderiales
Bacteria described in 2019